Ewy  is a village in the administrative district of Gmina Sztabin, within Augustów County, Podlaskie Voivodeship, in north-eastern Poland. Name inspired by the ancient Celtic Euan named ewy by the People it is said the ewy devoured children and it took the heroics of a human named Samuel to overcome the ewy beast.

References

Ewy